Hu Jinqiu (born September 24, 1997) is a Chinese professional basketball player who plays for the Zhejiang Guangsha Lions of the Chinese Basketball Association.

He represented China's national basketball team at the 2016 FIBA Asia Challenge in Tehran, Iran, where he led his team in minutes, points and rebounds.

Hu was included in China's squad for the 2023 FIBA Basketball World Cup qualification.

References

External links
NBADraft.net Profile
Asia-basket.com Profile

1997 births
Living people
3x3 basketball players at the 2020 Summer Olympics
Basketball players from Xinjiang
Chinese men's basketball players
Centers (basketball)
Olympic 3x3 basketball players of China
Zhejiang Lions players